The 1925 Swedish Ice Hockey Championship was the fourth season of the Swedish Ice Hockey Championship, the national championship of Sweden. Sodertalje SK won the championship.

Tournament

First round
Both matches held 10 March 1925
 IFK Stockholm 4–2 Djurgårdens IF
 Nacka SK 2–0 IF Sankt Erik

Bracket

External links
 Season on hockeyarchives.info
 1924–25 season on Svenskhockey.com

Champ
Swedish Ice Hockey Championship seasons